Leopold Novak (born 3 December 1990) is a Croatian professional footballer who plays as a defender for Zmaj Makarska.

Career
He played in the Premier League of Bosnia and Herzegovina for NK Vitez. He joined Urania Baška Voda from Swiss amateur side Spreitenbach in August 2020.

References

External links
 
 

1990 births
Living people
People from Makarska
Association football defenders
Croatian footballers
HNK Zmaj Makarska players
NK Hrvatski Dragovoljac players
NK Lučko players
HNK Cibalia players
Sint-Truidense V.V. players
NK Zagreb players
FC Brașov (1936) players
NK Vitez players
ACS Poli Timișoara players
Croatian Football League players
First Football League (Croatia) players
Challenger Pro League players
Liga I players
Premier League of Bosnia and Herzegovina players
Croatian expatriate footballers
Expatriate footballers in Belgium
Croatian expatriate sportspeople in Belgium
Expatriate footballers in Romania
Croatian expatriate sportspeople in Romania
Expatriate footballers in Switzerland
Croatian expatriate sportspeople in Switzerland